State Road 572 (SR 572) is a  state highway in Polk County, Florida, that runs from U.S. Route 92 (US 92) and North Galloway Road in western Lakeland to Pipkin Creek Road and South Parkway Frontage Road. The road runs in an L-shape with its east–west leg running generally parallel to SR 570 (Polk Parkway).

Major intersections

References

External links

FDOT map of Polk County (including SR 572)

572
572